Los Hang Ten's was a Peruvian rock band formed in 1964, originally from the San Isidro District in the country's capital Lima, from which the band Traffic Sound, the first so-called rock "supergroup" in that country's music history, drew two of its original members and, through them, the main idea regarding its creation.

Beginnings
In the early months of 1964, a number of the more rock music-inclined members of the Christian Brothers' "Santa María School" student body, specifically a few of those amongst them attending the 9th grade, decided to create a rock band in order to entertain their friends and schoolmates, primarily at school events and parties. The name of the band, "Los Hang Ten's" – a direct derivative of Hang Ten, a complex surfing manoeuver, but keeping the article "Los", in Spanish, (as opposed to the English "The") –, was chosen by consensus by the original group members, most of whom were surf, as well as music aficionados in their remaining free time.

Initially, the group had the brothers José (b. Lima, 1950), and Freddy (b. Lima, 1952) Rizo-Patrón Buckley playing lead and rhythm guitar, respectively (their mother a US national from Boston),  with the then future Minister of Justice and Foreign Affairs of Perú – as well as President of the Inter-American Court of Human Rights –, Diego García Sayán Larrabure (born August 2, 1950, in New York, NY), on drums. Diego was the youngest son of Enrique García Sayán, Foreign Minister of Peru from 1946 to 1948.  The line-up was completed with schoolmates Ramón de Orbegoso Elejalde (b. Lima, 1950), who played 2nd rhythm guitar, and Felipe Larrabure Aramburú (b. Lima, 1950), who was García Sayán's first cousin, on lead vocals.

A few weeks after, another schoolmate, future music impresario Arturo Rodrigo Santistevan (b. Lima, 1949), joined the group by playing the tambourine, as well as, on the occasion, did another school friend, the future "Traffic Sound" lead singer, DJ and businessman, Manuel Sanguinetti (b. Lima, 1950), who sang several songs with Larrabure, by providing back-up vocals to each other, in alternance.

Influences
The group was influenced by the arrival of the so-called "British Invasion", which had taken over the United States by storm, the latter a country most of their members had visited on either school-sponsored, family, or personal vacation trips, the two previous summers.

Most notably, it was the sound of the UK group The Kinks, led by the Davies brothers, Dave and Ray, that impressed them the most, which led them into performing covers of almost their entire set of hits, ranging from rockers like "You really got me", "Till the end of the day" and "All day and all of the night", to the blues infested "Com'on now", or power ballads like "Baby, where have all the good times gone" and "Tired of waiting for you".

In the next two years, classics from the Beach Boys, The Young Rascals, Donovan and the Rolling Stones became a part of repertoire, including the latter group's first two big US and UK hits, "Get off my cloud" and "Time is on my side" and starting in the summer of 1965, "Satisfaction". The Beatles, by then the world's most successful artists, were also influential, although it was mostly covers they had done themselves of early US rockers, like Chuck Berry's "Rock and Roll Music", which ended up becoming part of "Los Hang Ten's" play list.

In their manner of dress, at least in its early formative stage, the group wore what was then, and still remains, a quite unique attire consisting of a turtleneck, usually in light blue and white horizontal stripes, under dark suits.

Recording
After developing a fan base consisting of the families and friends of their schoolmates, and of teens who did not attend "Santa Maria" School but who had become their followers and, soon after playing live in several important festivals, executives at "Odeon", then one of the major Peruvian record labels, suggested that they record a single, which soon materialized with their recording of "Till the end of the day", their favorite Kinks composition, as the "A" side, and a blistering, unusual version of Nancy Sinatra's then massive worldwide hit, "These boots are made for walking", on the flip side.

Both sides of the single (the 45 RPM, Odeon 45-9671, was released in November 1966), drew fair airplay, mostly in AM stations, as was the custom in Peru's radio broadcasting, particularly insofar as Rock-oriented music in the mid-sixties is concerned. Conversely, because "Odeon" released only a relatively small print, consisting of 500 copies, the single has become with the passing of time, a coveted music memorabilia item for both Peruvian and Latin American early rock aficionados alike. The musicians who played on that recording were the original 5 members, plus Rodrigo, who played the tambourine and left the group, soon after.

Changes and ulterior disbandment
In the spring of 1967, José Rizo-Patrón left "Los Hang Ten's" to create another band. He contacted Sanguinetti to sing lead, as well as dovetailed his efforts to create a super band,   with those made simultaneously by the members of some other bands, namely lead guitarist Guillermo (Willito) Barclay Ricketts,  bass man Guillermo (Willy)   Thorne Valega  ( Lima, 1950-2019), drummer Luis (Lucho)  Nevares and, sax player Jean Pierre Magnet, their combined efforts, as well as those of his brother Freddy, who soon after also left "Los Hang Ten's", thus leading to the final creation of Traffic Sound.

In the meantime, the "Los Hang Ten's" line-up was immediately re-arranged, as original 2nd rhythm guitar player Orbegoso switched to lead guitar, with another schoolmate, Jaime Sabal Saba (b. Lima, 1951) being added to play bass. Still another former child schoolmate, – who by then was attending another high school –, Juan de Aliaga Fernandini (b. Lima, 1951), was then recruited to play the 1st rhythm guitar position left vacant by Freddy once he joined "Traffic Sound".  José, who had left "Los Hang Ten's earlier to join "Traffic Sound") later chose not to continue, opting instead to dedicate his time fully to his university studies.

Finally, in mid-1967, drummer García-Sayán recruited a close friend, the then future United Nations official and Nicaraguan Ambassador to Brazil and Perú, Guillermo F. Pérez-Argüello, (b. Lima, 1950), to join the band and sing additional songs, mostly R&B and early Rock and Roll classics.  Perez-Arguello is the nephew, on his father's side,    of the fifth Secretary General of the United Nations, Javier Pérez de Cuéllar (b.Lima,  1920-2020),  as well as the great grand son, on his mother's side, of the 1959 Woman of the Americas,  Dame Angélica Balladares Montealegre (1872-1973), herself the aunt of actress Madeleine Stowe and of Felicia Montealegre, the  Costa Rican-born wife of US music composer and conductor Leonard Bernstein

Until about February 1968, "Los Hang Ten's" continued playing, mostly at week-end festivals and ad hoc venues but, with their college and university education just around the corner, they all parted along different ways, some taking up higher studies abroad, as was the case for Pérez-Argüello who obtained college and post graduate degrees in the US and Britain,  first at the College of the Holy Cross and later at Oxford University,  with the   others remaining in Peruvian universities, some simultaneously joining other bands, as did Aliaga and Orbegoso, who played with a few rock bands in the next two years.

To this date, several of them remain very close as friends and, on occasion, still jam together.

References
 "Demoler", by Carlos Lopez Rotondo (Madrid, Spain, 2009, pp 149–51).
 http://www.incarock.com/inca_rock/irbio/bio7.htm
 https://www.youtube.com/watch?v=LIwhRq4RrI0
 https://www.youtube.com/watch?v=D-1Fam2YSyw

Peruvian rock music groups